Daytime Friends is the third studio album by Kenny Rogers for United Artists Records, released worldwide in 1977. It was his second major success following the break-up of The First Edition in 1976 (his first album Love Lifted Me was a minor success, with his second, the self-titled Kenny Rogers, going to Number 1 on the US country charts and crossing over to the mainstream pop charts in many countries).

The album produced two top 10 singles with the title cut reaching No. 1 on the country singles and tracks chart (and the top 40 in the UK singles chart) and "Sweet Music Man" (Rogers' own composition) reaching No. 9. Elsewhere on the album is a song called "Am I Too Late" which was not released as a single, despite Rogers later saying it was one of his favorite songs . Another track "My World Begins and Ends With You" was later recorded by Dave & Sugar, who had a hit single with it in 1979.

The album reached No. 2 on the Country charts.

Track listing

Personnel
 Kenny Rogers – lead vocals
 Bobby Wood, Charles Cochran, Edgar Struble, Gene Golden, Hargus "Pig" Robbins, Steve Glassmeyer – keyboards
 Shane Keister – Moog synthesizer
 Billy Sanford, David Kirby, Jerry Shook, Jimmy Capps, Jimmy Colvard, Johnny Christopher, Larry Keith, Reggie Young, T.G. Engel – guitars
 Pete Drake – steel guitar
 Joe Osborn, Mike Leech – bass guitar
 Tommy Allsup – six-string bass guitar
 Bob Moore – upright bass
 Bobby Daniels, Jerry Carrigan, Kenny Malone – drums
 Brenton Banks, Byron Bach, Carl Gorodetzky, Gary Vanosdale, George Binkley, Lennie Haight, Marvin Chantry, Pam Sixfin, Roy Christensen, Sheldon Kurland, Stephanie Woolf, Steven Smith, Willi Lehmann – strings
 Bill Justis – string arrangements
 Bergen White, Bobby Daniels, Buzz Cason, Don Gant, Gene Golden, Johnny MacRae, The Jordanaires, Larry Keith, Randy Rogers, Sandy Rogers, Steve Glassmeyer, Steve Pippin – backing vocals

Production
 Producer – Larry Butler
 Engineers – Harold Lee and Billy Sherrill
 Remix – Billy Sherrill
 Recorded at American Studios and Jack Clement Recording Studios (Nashville, TN).
 Mastered by Bob Sowell at Master Control (Nashville, TN).
 Art Direction – Ria Lewerke
 Design – Bill Burks
 Photography – Gary Regester
 Management – Ken Kragen

Westlife version
Irish pop band Westlife recorded it in 2002 with a live performance of it. They renamed it also to "Daytime Friends, Nighttime Lovers".

Charts

Weekly charts

Year-end charts

References

Kenny Rogers albums
1977 albums
United Artists Records albums
Albums arranged by Bill Justis
Albums produced by Larry Butler (producer)